Khalga and Kaban were two Khazar Khagans listed in the Cäğfär Taríxı, a Tatar language book purporting to be a history of the early Turkic peoples. According to that work they ruled during the 660s. They are not mentioned in any other historical source, and since Cäğfär Taríxı is believed to be a forgery created by the NKVD, the existence of these two kings is highly suspect.

Khazar rulers